The 2019 Dunedin mayoral election was held on 12 October 2019. It was conducted with a single transferable vote (STV) system. Aaron Hawkins was elected for his first term as Dunedin's 58th Mayor after beating 13 other candidates. Nominations opened on 19 July 2019 and closed on 16 August 2019.

Candidates

Declared candidates
Scout Barbour-Evans
Bob Barlin
Finn Campbell
Rachel Elder, Dunedin City Councillor
Christine Garey, Dunedin City Councillor
Aaron Hawkins, Dunedin City Councillor
Carmen Houlahan
Mandy Mayhem-Bullock, Waikouaiti Coast Community Board member
Malcolm Moncrief-Spittle
Jim O'Malley, Dunedin City Councillor
Jules Radich, business consultant
Richard Seager
Lee Vandervis, Dunedin City Councillor
Andrew Whiley, Dunedin City Councillor

Declined to be candidates
Dave Cull, incumbent Mayor
Barry Timmings, businessman

Results

References

Politics of Dunedin
Mayoral elections in Dunedin
Dunedin
2010s in Dunedin